Ozothamnus alpinus, commonly known as  alpine everlasting, is a flowering plant in the family Asteraceae. It is endemic to alpine and subalpine areas in south-eastern continental Australia.

Description
The leaf upper surface is green and smooth, the lower surface  yellowish with furry, long, stiff, shiny simple hairs. The 15-19 pink or red outer bracts stand out when the flowers are in bud.

Taxonomy and naming
This species was described in 1951 by Norman Wakefield based on a specimen collected  in 1888 by Carl Walter at Mount Hotham and given the name Helichrysum alpinum. In 1991 Arne A. Anderberg gave it the name Ozothamnus alpinus and the description was published in Opera Botanica.

Distribution and habitat
Alpine everlasting occurs from the Mount Kosciuszko area and southwards on the edge of wet alpine heath or in bogs.

References

alpinus
Asterales of Australia
Flora of New South Wales
Flora of Victoria (Australia)
Plants described in 1951